Thomas Carroll (26 February 1884 – 3 June 1957) was an Australian cricketer. He played eleven first-class matches for Tasmania between 1907 and 1922.

See also
 List of Tasmanian representative cricketers

References

External links
 

1884 births
1957 deaths
Australian cricketers
Tasmania cricketers
Cricketers from Hobart